Abu Talib (born Fred Leroy Robinson; February 24, 1939 – October 8, 2009) was an American blues and R&B guitarist.

Career
Born in Memphis, Tennessee, he was raised in the state of Arkansas and moved to Chicago, Illinois, in 1956. Inspired as a guitarist by Joe Willie Wilkins, he first recorded that year, backing harmonica player Birmingham Jones. In 1958, he began touring with Little Walter, and after seeing a jazz band perform was inspired to learn music formally at the Chicago School of Music. He also began working with Howlin' Wolf, recording with him such notable blues classics as "Spoonful", "Back Door Man" and "Wang Dang Doodle". In the mid-1960s, he played with R&B singers Jerry Butler and Syl Johnson, before joining Ray Charles' band in Los Angeles.  While there, he recorded the instrumental "Black Fox", which became a minor pop hit reaching #56 on the Billboard Hot 100 and # 29 on the R&B chart.

In the early 1970s, he worked with English blues bandleader John Mayall, playing on the album  Jazz Blues Fusion, and recorded LPs with trumpeter Blue Mitchell. He also recorded two albums in his own name - At The Drive In and Off The Cuff, on which he was supported by Joe Sample and Wilton Felder of The Crusaders - for Enterprise, a subsidiary of Stax Records.  He also worked with Earl Gaines and Jimmy Rogers in the 1950s and 1960s, Monk Higgins and Stanley Turrentine in the 1970s, and Bobby Bland in the 1980s. In addition to his studio and touring collaborations, Talib also recorded solo, re-emerging in 1994 with an album of his own compositions, The Real Thing at Last.

Personal life
Talib converted to Islam in 1975 and changed his name to Abu Talib. After his first wife died, Talib remarried and fathered seven children in his two marriages.

On October 8, 2009, Talib died of cancer in Lancaster, California. He was 70.

Discography

Singles
 1962: "The Buzzard/The Hawk" - Queen
 1966: "The Creeper/Go-Go-Girl" - Checker
 1968: "The Coming Atlantis/Before Six" - World Pacific
 1968: "The Oogum Boogum Song/Black Fox" - World Pacific
 1968: "I Likes Yah/Stinger" - Cobblestone
 1970: "Carmalita/Stone Stallion" - Liberty
 1977: "I Like to Dance/Kneebone" - ICA

Albums
 1968: The Coming Atlantis (later entitled Black Fox) World Pacific
 1968: Hot Fun in the Summertime  World Pacific/Liberty
 1971: At the Drive-In - Enterprise/Polydor/P-Vine
 1973: Off the Cuff - Enterprise/P-Vine
 1994: The Real Thing at Last - Son Pat
 1999: Bluesology - Ace

Collaborations
With Monk Higgins
1968: Extra Soul Perception - Solid State
With Milt Jackson
 1969: Memphis Jackson - Impulse!
With John Mayall
 1972: Jazz Blues Fusion - Polydor
  1973: Moving On - Polydor
 1973  Ten Years are Gone
With Blue Mitchell
 1972: Blues' Blues - Mainstream
 1973: Graffiti Blues - Mainstream

Filmography 
 Moon Over Harlem (1939)
 Boarding House Blues (1948)
 Killer Diller (1948)

References

Bibliography
The Freddy Robinson - Abu Talib Story by Bill Dahl. Blues & Rhythm - The Gospel Truth No. 145 (Christmas 1999), pp. 8 – 13

External links
Illustrated Abu Talib / Freddy Robinson discography

1939 births
2009 deaths
Musicians from Memphis, Tennessee
American blues guitarists
American male guitarists
African-American guitarists
American blues harmonica players
American blues singer-songwriters
Mainstream Records artists
Deaths from cancer in California
American Muslims
20th-century American guitarists
Singer-songwriters from Tennessee
Guitarists from Tennessee
African-American male singer-songwriters
20th-century African-American male singers